Jean Stelli (6 December 1894 in Lille – 2 February 1975 in Grasse) was a French screenwriter and film director.

Selected filmography
 The Hurricane on the Mountain (1922)
 Gibraltar (1938)
 Cristobal's Gold (1940)
 The Blue Veil (1942)
 The White Waltz (1943)
 The Temptation of Barbizon (1946)
 The Mysterious Monsieur Sylvain (1947)
 Five Red Tulips (1949)
 Last Love (1949)
 Sending of Flowers (1950)
 The Unexpected Voyager (1950)
 Maria of the End of the World (1951)
 Mammy (1951)
 The Night Is Ours (1953)
 The Lovers of Marianne (1953)
 Baratin (1956)

External links

1894 births
1975 deaths
French film directors
French male screenwriters
20th-century French screenwriters
Mass media people from Lille
20th-century French male writers